South Tehidy is a hamlet north of Camborne in west Cornwall, England.

References

Hamlets in Cornwall